José Belizón Tocino (28 October 1930, in Puerto Real, (Cádiz) – 27 November 1997, in Cádiz) was a Spanish painter. He was born in a humble family and showed good skills for drawing since he was a child. He lived his early childhood during the Spanish Civil War. Early, he had contact with other artists, like Pierre de Matheu. He combined his artistic activity with his job as forger in the shipyards of Puerto Real. He was married to María Ligero Bernal and had three sons and eight daughters.

He mainly used oil paint in his works, as well as other techniques like fresco painting. His work includes a wide range of themes (landscapes, portraits, marines), all of them in a figurative style. At the same time, he worked in restoration of paintings and sculptures. His most important artistic references and influences must be found among the baroque Spanish painters, such as Velázquez, Murillo or Zurbarán and other later ones like Goya.

During his lifetime, he took part in many art exhibitions throughout the province of Cádiz. In 1983, the Council of Puerto Real made him work in a big-dimension painting to commemorate the fifth centennial of the foundation of Puerto Real by the Catholic Monarchs of Spain in 1483. That oil painting was placed in the main hall of the old Town Hall in Puerto Real, showing the moment of the foundation of the city in a scene where many local places can be recognised.

After his death in 1997, an exhibition reuniting most of his work was organised in Puerto Real. Nowadays, a street in his hometown, has his name. His works are owned by both public and private owners and organizations in Spain and other European countries.

References

1930 births
1997 deaths
20th-century Spanish painters
20th-century Spanish male artists
Spanish male painters